Close Enough for Love is the thirty-ninth studio album by American pop singer Andy Williams, released in 1986 by Atco Records. Williams writes in the liner notes: "This is essentially a ‘live’ album. Our objective was to get real performances from both the orchestra and myself, as opposed to the sometimes sterile perfection of countless overdubs and tracking sessions. To my amazement, we used the first takes on most of the songs. The excitement of first hearing Jeremy's arrangements affected me so, that I found a quality in my singing that wasn't there in later takes."

The phrase "Romantic Music from the Movies" on the back of the CD booklet conveys the theme of the album, with half of the songs dating from the decade previous to its release and the other half going back to the era of traditional pop. Williams even updates the title songs from two of his albums, "Moon River" and "Days of Wine and Roses", with what, for 1986, were very modern adult contemporary arrangements. The one selection that didn't originate on the big screen was the 1944 jazz standard "'Round Midnight", which had recently been part of the soundtrack of the film of the same name.

Williams told an interviewer at the time that he was excited the album was being released by Atco. "It's a label for rock 'n' rollers, but they're very excited about the album. They're going to promote it like they promote Twisted Sister," Williams said. "They think I can have a hit."

Track listing

Side one
 "How Do You Keep the Music Playing?" from Best Friends (Alan Bergman, Marilyn Bergman, Michel Legrand) - 4:36
 "Moon River" from Breakfast at Tiffany's (Henry Mancini, Johnny Mercer) - 4:10
 "Change Partners" from Carefree (Irving Berlin) - 4:06
 "Lucky to Be Me" from On the Town (Betty Comden, Adolph Green) - 4:04
 "My Funny Valentine" from Babes in Arms (Lorenz Hart, Richard Rodgers) - 3:56

Side two
 "Days of Wine and Roses" from Days of Wine and Roses (Henry Mancini, Johnny Mercer) - 4:14
 "Through the Eyes of Love" from Ice Castles (Marvin Hamlisch, Carole Bayer Sager) - 4:46
 "Close Enough for Love" from Agatha (Johnny Mandel, Paul Williams) - 3:46
 "The Music of Goodbye" from Out of Africa (John Barry, Alan Bergman, Marilyn Bergman) - 4:32
 "'Round Midnight" (Bernie Hanighen, Thelonious Monk, Cootie Williams) - 5:44

Personnel
Adapted from the liner notes.

Musicians
Trevor Bastow - keyboards
Nigel Black - French horn
Jeffrey Bryant - French horn
John Chambers - percussion
Harry Fisher - drums
Tristan Fry - percussion
Paul Hart - keyboards
Chris Karan - drums, percussion
Duncan Lamont - tenor sax solos
Jeremy Lubbock - keyboards ("How Do You Keep the Music Playing?", "Moon River", "My Funny Valentine", "'Round Midnight")
Andy MacIntosh - alto sax solos
Mike Moran - keyboards
John Pigneguy - French horn
Frank Ricotti - percussion
Ray Russell - electric guitar
Paul Westwood - bass
Sean Whittle - keyboards
Andy Williams - vocals

Production
Jeremy Lubbock - producer, arranger (with acknowledgments), conductor (except as noted)
John Lubbock - conductor ("How Do You Keep the Music Playing?", "Moon River", "'Round Midnight")
David Foster - arranger acknowledgment ("How Do You Keep the Music Playing?")
Larry Williams - arranger acknowledgment ("The Music of Goodbye")
Johnny Mandel - arranger acknowledgment ("Close Enough for Love")
 John Arrias - engineer, mixer
Aaron Denson - assistant engineer
John Powell - assistant engineer
Steve Jackson - assistant engineer
Matt Howe - mixing assistant
Barry Diament - CD mastering 
Bernie Grundman - LP mastering
George Hamer - contractor
Jack Rothstein - concertmaster
Kenneth Sillito - concertmaster
Richard Studt - concertmaster
Aaron Rapoport - cover photo
Bob Defrin - art direction

References

1986 albums
Andy Williams albums
Atco Records albums